Rollback attack may refer to:

 Version rollback attack or downgrade attack, on a network protocol
 Blockchain rollback attack or 51-percent attack, on a cryptocurrency blockchain